This is a list of films produced in the Netherlands during the 1930s. The films were produced in the Dutch language.

1930s
Films
Dutch